Mooney is a family name.

Mooney may also refer to:
Mooney (radio programme), an Irish radio programme
Mooney International Corporation, an American aircraft manufacturer

See also
Moony
Mooneye
Moonie (disambiguation)